Chilodonta is a genus of sea snails, marine gastropod mollusks in the family Chilodontaidae.

Species
Species within the genus Chilodonta include:
 Chilodonta suduirauti Poppe, Tagaro & Dekker, 2006

References

 Poppe, G., Tagaro, S. & Dekker, H., 2006. The Seguenziidae, Chilodontidae, Trochidae, Calliostomatidae and Solariellidae of the Philippines Islands. Visaya: 1-128, sér. Supplément 2

 
Chilodontaidae
Monotypic gastropod genera